This is a list of malacologists, scientists who study mollusks, such as snails, clams, cephalopods, and others, in a discipline named malacology. People who specialize in studying only or primarily the shells of mollusks are sometimes called conchologists instead of malacologists. Many of these malacologists are notable for having named species and other taxa of mollusks.

This list focuses primarily on people who study or studied recent taxa of mollusks rather than fossil mollusks, so only a few paleontologists are included here. The list also includes researchers who devoted some of their research effort to malacology and some to other sciences.

Considering that mollusks are such a very large and diverse phylum of invertebrates, malacology in general is greatly understaffed in its research efforts. For example, there is no living malacological expert who can properly identify all the species of Onchidiidae (about 143 species). There are also not enough malacologists studying freshwater snails.

A
Donald Putnam Abbott (1920–1986) United States
R. Tucker Abbott (1919–1995) United States
William Adam (1909–1988) Belgium
Arthur Adams (1820–1878) Great Britain (brother of Henry Adams)
Charles Baker Adams (1814–1853) United States
Henry Adams (1813–1877) Great Britain (brother of Arthur Adams)
Johann Christian Albers (1795–1857) Germany
Joshua Alder (1792–1867) Great Britain
Frederick Aldrich (1927–1991) United States
Truman Heminway Aldrich (1848–1932) United States, civil engineer and paleontologist
César Marie Félix Ancey (1860–1906) France
George French Angas (1822–1886) Great Britain
John Gould Anthony (1804-1877) United States
Hermann Eduard Anton (1794–1872) Germany
Allan Frost Archer (1908-1994) United States
Edwin Ashby (1861–1941) Australia, expert in chitons
Jean Victoire Audouin (1797–1841) France

B
Kikutaro Baba (1905–2001) Japan
Fred Baker (1854–1938) United States
Horace Burrington Baker (1889–1971), American malacologist
David Dwight Baldwin (1831–1912), Hawaii, United StatesA. Studied land snails of Hawaii.
Keppel Harcourt Barnard (1887–1964) South Africa
Paul Bartsch (1871–1960) American malacologist and carcinologist of German origin
Frederick Bayer (1921–2007) United States
Arthur René Jean Baptiste Bavay (1840–1923) France
Richard Henry Beddome (1830–1911) England
Henrik Henriksen Beck (1799–1863) Denmark
Luigi Bellardi (1818–1889) Italy
William Henry Benson (1803–1870), malacologist "Great Britain/India/South Africa"
Joseph Charles Bequaert (1886–1982) Belgium, United States
Leszek Berger (1925–2012) Poland
Rudolph Bergh (1824–1909) Denmark
Samuel Stillman Berry (1887-1984)
Rüdiger Bieler (born 1955)
Amos Binney (1803–1847) United States
William G. Binney (1833–1909) United States
Caroline Birley (1851–1907) England
Hope Black (1919–2018) Australia
Henri Marie Ducrotay de Blainville (1777–1850) France
Willis Blatchley (1859–1940) United States
Caesar Rudolf Boettger (1888–1976) Germany
Oskar Boettger (1844–1910) Germany
Mia Boissevain (1878–1959) Netherlands
Ignaz von Born (1742–1791) Austria
Filippo Bonanni (1638–1723) Italy
Kristine Elisabeth Heuch Bonnevie (1872–1948) biologist and Norway's first female professor
Nicolas Robert Bouchard-Chantereaux (1802–1864) France
Philippe Bouchet (1953–) France
Jules René Bourguignat (1829–1892) France
Thomas Edward Bowdich (1791–1824) England
John William Brazier (1842–1930) Australia
William Broderip (1789–1859) England
Captain Thomas Brown (1785–1862) Great Britain
Adolph Cornelis van Bruggen (A. C. van Bruggen, Dolf van Bruggen) (1929–2016) Netherlands and South Africa
Jean Guillaume Bruguière (1749–1798) France
Spiridon Brusina (1845–1909) Croatia
Rykel de Bruyne Netherlands
James Bulwer (1794–1879) England 
John B. Burch (1929–) United States 
Robert Burn (1937–) Australia

C
Frédéric Cailliaud (1787–1869) France
Alfred de Candie de Saint-Simon (1731–1851) Toulouse, France.
Philip Pearsall Carpenter (1819–1877) England
Thomas Frederic Cheeseman (1845–1923) New Zealand
Johann Hieronymus Chemnitz (1730–1800) Germany
Jean-Charles Chenu (1808–1879) France
Carl Chun (1852–1914) Germany
George Hubbard Clapp (1858–1949) United States
William J. Clench (1897–1984) United States
Stefan Clessin (1833–1911) Germany
Theodore Dru Alison Cockerell (1866–1948) United States
Walter Edward Collinge (1867–1947) Great Britain
Matthew William Kemble Connolly (1872–1947) Great Britain and South Africa
Timothy Abbott Conrad (1803-1877) United States
Charles Montague Cooke, Jr. (1874–1948) Hawaii
William Cooper (1798–1864) United States
Alexandre Édouard Maurice Cossmann (1850–1924) France
Bernard Charles Cotton (1905-1966) Australia
James Hamilton Couper (1794–1866) United States
Joseph Pitty Couthouy (1808–1864) United States
Georges Coutagne (1854–1928) France
James Charles Cox [M.D.] (1834–1912) Australia
Leslie Reginald Cox (1897–1965) Great Britain
Percy Zachariah Cox [Major General, Sir] (1864–1937) Great Britain and Iran
Henry Crampton (1875–1956) United States
Joseph Charles Hippolyte Crosse (1826–1898) France
Cyril Crossland (1878–1943) England
Hugh Cuming (1791–1865) England
Georges Cuvier (1769–1832) France

D
Dezallier d'Argenville (1680–1765) France
Emanuel Mendes da Costa (1717–1791) England
William Healey Dall (1845–1927) United States
Philippe Dautzenberg (1849–1935) Belgian
Léopold de Folin (1817–1896) France
Jacques Louis Marin DeFrance (1758–1850) France
Pierre Denys de Montfort (1766–1820) France
Richard Dell (1920–2002) New Zealand
Gérard Paul Deshayes (1795–1875) France
Charles des Moulins (1798–1875) France
Lewis Weston Dillwyn (1778–1855) Great Britain
Heinrich Wolfgang Ludwig Dohrn (1838–1913) Germany, also entomologist
Edward Donovan (1768–1837) Ireland
Alcide d'Orbigny (1802–1857) France
Jacques Philippe Raymond Draparnaud (1772–1804) France
Wilhelm Dunker (1809–1885) Germany

E
Charles Eliot, full name: Sir Charles Norton Edgcumbe Eliot (1862–1931)
Arthur Erskine Ellis (1902–1983) Great Britain 
William Keith Emerson (1925–2016) United States
Bob Entrop (1917–1987) Netherlands

F
Paul Fagot (1842–1908) French malacologist
Jules Favre (1882–1959) Switzerland
James Ferriss (1849–1926) United States
André Étienne d'Audebert de Férussac (1786–1836) France, also a naturalist
Henri Filhol (1843–1902) France
Harold John Finlay (1901–1951) New Zealand palaeontologist and conchologist
Paul Henri Fischer (1835 – 1893) France
John Fleming (1785–1857) Scotland
Léopold de Folin (1817–1896) France
Charles-François Fontannes (1839–1886) France
Edward Forbes (1815–1845) Great Britain
Lothar H.E.W. Forcart (1902–1990) Switzerland
André Franc (1911–1990s) France

G
Charles John Gabriel (1879–1963) Australia
Joseph Paul Gaimard (1796–1858) France
Andrew Garrett (1823–1887) United States
Louis Germain (1878–1942) France
David Geyer (1855–1932) Germany
Theodore Gill (1837–1914) United States
Gonzalo Giribet (1970–) Spain. United States
Johann Friedrich Gmelin (1748–1804) Germany
Henry Haversham Godwin-Austen (1834–1923) Great Britain, British India
Augustus Addison Gould (1805–1866) United States
Stephen Jay Gould (1941–2002) United States, paleontologist who also studied land snails.
Alastair Graham (1906–2000) Great Britain
Jean-Pierre Sylvestre de Grateloup (1782–1862) France
Edward Whitaker Gray (1748–1806) Great Britain
Elizabeth Gray (1831–1924) Great Britain
Francis Calley Gray (1790–1856) United States
John Edward Gray (1800–1875) Great Britain
Maria Emma Gray (1787–1876) Great Britain, wife of John Edward Gray
Russell Gray (died 1948) United States
Samuel Frederick Gray (1766–1828) Great Britain
Georg Grimpe (1889–1936) Germany
Karl Grobben (1854–1945) Austria
Niccolò Gualtieri (1688–1744) Italy
Gerard Pierre Laurent Kalshoven Gude (1858–1924) Great Britain
John Thomas Gulick (1832–1923) Hawaii, developed evolution theories with Charles Darwin
Robert John Lechmere Guppy (1836–1916) Trinidad.

H
Fritz Haas (1886–1969) Germany
Georg Haas (1905–1981) Israel
Samuel Stehman Haldeman (1812–1880) United States
Sylvanus Charles Thorp Hanley (1819–1899) Great Britain
Johan Conrad van Hasselt (1797–1823) vertebratologist, he also studied mollusks from Java
Gerhard Haszprunar (1957–) Austria
Bernhard Hausdorf, Germany
William H. Heard (1935–) United States
Charles Hedley (1862–1926) Great Britain, but mostly active in Australia
Friedrich Held (1812–1872) Germany
Joseph Heller (1941–) Israel
Henry Hemphill (1830–1914) United States
John Brooks Henderson Jr. (1870–1923) United States
Junius Henderson (1865–1937) United States
Leo George Hertlein (1898 – 1972) United States
Pierre Marie Heude (1836 –1902) France
Joaquín González Hidalgo y Rodríguez (1839–1923), Spain
Richard Brinsley Hinds (1811–1846) Great Britain
Shintarō Hirase  (1884–1939) Japan
Yoichirō Hirase  (1859–1925) Japan, father of Shintarō Hirase
Frederick George "Eric" Hochberg (1941–), United States
Hans Hoffmann (1896-1947) Germany
William Evans Hoyle (1855–1926) Great Britain
Thomas George Bond Howes (1853–1905) Great Britain
Leslie Hubricht (1908–2005) United States
George Humphrey (1739–1826) Great Britain
Christian Hee Hwass (1731–1803) Denmark

I
Tom Iredale (1880–1972) England
Arturo Issel (1842–1922) Italy

J
John Clarkson Jay (1808–1891) American amateur conchologist. 
John Gwyn Jeffreys (1809–1885) Great Britain
Charles Willison Johnson (1863–1932) American naturalist and malacologist
George Johnston (1797–1855) British malacologist
Israel Heymann Jonas (1795–1851) German malacologist
Louis Joubin (1861–1935) France
Félix Pierre Jousseaume (1835–1921) France

K
Sally Diana Kaicher (1922–1999) United States, Author and Illustrator: Card Catalogue of Worldwide Shells, 1973-1992
E. Alison Kay (1928–2008) United States
Myra Keen (1905–1986) United States
Louis Charles Kiener (1799–1891) France
Richard Kilburn (1942–2013) South Africa
Thomas William Kirk (1856–1936) New Zealand
Jared Potter Kirtland (1793–1877) United States
Wilhelm Kobelt (1840–1916) Germany
Yoshio Kondo (1910–1990) Hawaii
Dieter Korn (1958–) Germany
Christian Ferdinand Friedrich Krauss (1812–1890) Germany
Endre Krolopp (1935–2010) Hungary, interested in Quaternary and Tertiary molluscs
Tokubei Kuroda (1886–1987) Japan
Heinrich Carl Küster (1807–1876) Germany

L
Henri de Lacaze-Duthiers (1821–1901) France
Frank Fortescue Laidlaw (1876–1963) United Kingdom
Jean-Baptiste Lamarck (1744–1829) France
Charles Francis Laseron (1887–1959) United States, Australia
Isaac Lea (1792–1886) United States
José H. Leal Brazil
Henning Mourier Lemche (1904–1977) Denmark
Andrzej Lesicki (1950–)Poland
Michele Lessona (1823–1894) Italy
Mario Lessona (1855–1911) Italy
John Lightfoot (1735–1788) United Kingdom
David R. Lindberg (born 1948) United States
Vasiliy Lindholm (1874–1935) Russia
Karl Emil Lischke – :de:Karl Emil Lischke :fr:Karl Emil Lischke (1813–1886) Germany
Arnould Locard (1841–1904) France
Richard Thomas Lowe (1802–1874) United Kingdom
Sven Ludvig Lovén (1809–1895) Sweden, marine zoologist and malacologist

M
Jules François Mabille (1831–1904) France 
Frank Mace MacFarland (1869–1951) United States, Hopkins Marine Biological Station at Pacific Grove
William Macnae (1914–1975) South Africa.
Virginia Orr Maes (1920–1986) United States, malacologist associated with the Academy of Natural Sciences of Philadelphia
August Wilhelm Malm (1821–1882) Sweden
Hermann von Maltzan (1843–1891) Germany
Katharina Mangold-Wirz (1922–2003) Switzerland
Ernst Gustav Gotthelf Marcus (Ernesto) (1893–1968) Germany, Brazil, spouse of Eveline du Bois-Reymond Marcus
Eveline Du Bois-Reymond Marcus (1901–1990) Germany, Brazil
Bruce Marshall (1948–) New Zealand, taxonomist
Patrick Marshall (1869–1950) New Zealand, geologist
Eduard von Martens (1831–1904) Germany
Friedrich Wilhelm Martini (1729–1778) Germany
Thomas Martyn (1760–1816) England
Charles Johnson Maynard (1845–1929) United States
J. C. McConnell (1844–1904) United States
James Hamilton McLean (1936–) United States
James Cosmo Melvill (1845–1929) Great Britain
Auguste Ménégaux (1857–1937) France
Karl Theodor Menke (1791–1861) Germany
Artie L. Metcalf (1929–2016) United States
Friedrich Christian Meuschen (1719–1811) Germany
Louis André Gaspard Michaud (1795–1880) France, malacologist, also known as Gaspard Michaud and as A. L. G. Michaud
Jean-Louis Hardouin Michelin de Choisy (1786–1867) France 
Jesse Wedgwood Mighels (1795–1861) United States
John Samuel Miller (1783–1873) Great Britain 
Pierre-Aimé Millet (1783–1873) France 
Adolph Modéer (1738–1799) Sweden
Otto Franz von Möllendorff (1848–1903) Germany, malacologist
Hans Peter Christian Møller (1810–1845) Denmark/Greenland, author of Index Molluscorum Grönlandiae
Tommaso di Maria Allery Monterosato (1841–1927) Italy
John Edmund Sharrock Moore (1870–1947) Great Britain
Otto Andreas Lowson Mörch (1828–1878) Sweden, Denmark, France
Pierre Marie Arthur Morelet (1809–1892) France 
Edward Sylvester Morse (1838–1925) United States
Johann Rudolf Albert Mousson (1805–1890) France, Switzerland
Robert C. Murdoch (1861–1923) New Zealand

N
Adolf Naef (1883–1949) Switzerland
Walter Narchi (1929–2004) Brazil
Kir Nazimovich Nesis (1934–2003) Russia
Geoffrey Nevill (1843–1885) Great Britain
Wesley Newcomb (1818–1892) United States
Hugo Frederik Nierstrasz (1872–1937) Netherlands
Mark Norman Australia
Jean-Baptiste Noulet (1802–1890) France
Carlos Núñez Cortés (1942–) Argentina

O
Charles Henry O'Donoghue (1885–1961) England
Steve O'Shea (1965–) New Zealand
Nils Hjalmar Odhner (1884–1973) Sweden
William Erwood Old, Jr. (1928–1982) United States
Ida Shepard Oldroyd (1856–1940) United States
Tom Shaw Oldroyd (1853–1932) United States
Walter Reginald Brook Oliver (1883–1957) Australia, New Zealand
Alcide Charles Victor Marie Dessalines d'Orbigny (1802–1857) France
Charles Russell Orcutt (1864–1929) United States
Arnold Edward Ortmann (1863–1927) United States

P
J.J.I. Alcide de Paladilhe (1814–1876) France
Paul Maurice Pallary (1869–1942) France/Algeria
Katherine Evangeline Hilton Van Winkle Palmer (1895–1982) United States, Tertiary molluscs
Christine Parent Canada, land snails
Marianna Paulucci (1835–1919) Italy
William Harper Pease (1824–1871) United States
Jean Paul Louis Pelseneer (1863–1945) Belgium
Rémy Perrier (1861–1936) France
George Perry (1771-18??) Great Britain, naturalist and malacologist
Vladimir Pešić Montenegro
Sauveur Abel Aubert Petit de la Saussaye (1792–1870) France
Georg Johann Pfeffer (1854–1931) Germany, zoologist
Carl Jonas Pfeiffer (1779–1836) Germany
Ludwig Karl Georg Pfeiffer (1805–1877) Germany, physician, botanist and conchologist
Rodolfo Amando Philippi (1808–1904) Germany
Jean Piaget (1896-1980) Switzerland 
Henry Augustus Pilsbry (1862–1957) United States
István Pintér (1911–1998) Hungary
László Ernö Pintér (1942–2002) Hungary
Giuseppe Saverio Poli (1746–1825) Italy
Carlo Pollonera (1849–1923) Italy
Winston Ponder (1941–) New Zealand
John Ponsonby-Fane (1848–1916) Great Britain
Guido Poppe (1954–) Belgian 
Arthur William Baden Powell (1901–1987) New Zealand
Temple Prime (1832–1903) United States
Alice Pruvot-Fol (1873–1972) France
Flávio Dias Passos (1971–) Brazil

Q
Jean René Constant Quoy (1790–1869) France

R
Lewis Radcliffe (1880–1950) United States
Constantine Samuel Rafinesque (1783–1840) Ottoman Empire
Sander Rang (1793-1844) France
César Auguste Récluz (1799–1873) France
Lovell Augustus Reeve (1814–1865) United Kingdom
Harald Alfred Rehder (1907–1996) United States
Lois Corea Rehder (1911–1988) United States, spouse of Harald Alfred Rehder
Amanda Reid Australia
Otto Wilhelm Hermann Reinhardt (1838-1924) Germany
Hendrik van Rijgersma (1835–1877) Netherlands
Jean Risbec (1895–1964) France
Antoine Risso (1777–1845) France, naturalist
Guy Coburn Robson (1888–1945) United Kingdom
Alphonse Amédée Trémeau de Rochebrune (1836–1912) France
Jean-Pierre Rocroi France
Peter Friedrich Röding (1767–1846) Germany
Landon Timmonds Ross, Jr. (1942–) United States
Gary Rosenberg (born 1959) United States
Emil Adolf Rossmässler (1806–1867) Germany
Miriam Rothschild (1908–2005) United Kingdom
Jean Louis Florent Polydore Roux (1792–1833) France
William B. Rudman (1944–) New Zealand
John Ruskin (1819–1900) United Kingdom
Vasily Ermolaevich Ruzhentsev (1899–1978) Russia

S

Georg Ossian Sars (1837–1927) Norway, marine and freshwater biologist
Carl Ulisses von Salis-Marschlins (1762–1818) Switzerland
Madoka Sasaki (1883–1927) Japan
Thomas Say (1787–1834) United States
Christoffer Schander (1960–2012) Sweden, Director of University Museum of Bergen, Norway
Mattheus Marinus Schepman (1847–1919) Netherlands
Franz Xaver Alfred Johann Schilder (1896–1970) Germany
Menno Schilthuizen (1965–) Netherlands
Otto Heinrich Schindewolf (1896–1971) Germany, evolution of cephalopods
Johann Samuel Schröter (1735–1808) Germany
Gustav Schwartz (1809–1890) Austria
Heinrich Christian Friedrich Schumacher (1757–1830) Denmark
Revett Sheppard (1778–1830) Great Britain 
Bohumil Shimek (1861–1937) United States
Robert James Shuttleworth (1810–1874) Great Britain, Switzerland
Charles Torrey Simpson (1846–1932) United States
Heinrich Simroth (1851–1917) Germany
Claude Sionnest (1749–1820) France
Arthur Donaldson Smith (1864–1939) Great Britain
Charles Smith (topographer) (c. 1715–1762) Ireland
Edgar Albert Smith (1847–1916) Great Britain, zoologist
Eugene Allen Smith (1841–1927) United States, malacologist
Herbert Huntingdon Smith (1851–1919) United States
James Edward Smith (1759–1828) Great Britain
Sidney Irving Smith (1843–1926) United States, brother-in-law of A. E. Verrill
William Smith (1769–1839) Great Britain
William Walter Smith (1852–1942) New Zealand
Alan Solem, full name George Alan Solem (1931–1990) United States, curator of invertebrates in Field Museum of Natural History, Chicago
Árpád Soós (1912–1991) Hungary, son of Lajos Soós
Louis François Auguste Souleyet (1811–1852) France
George Brettingham Sowerby I (1788–1854) Great Britain
George Brettingham Sowerby II(1812–1884) Great Britain
George Brettingham Sowerby III (1843–1921) Great Britain
James Sowerby (1757–1822) Great Britain
Gerard Spaink (1928–2005) Netherlands
Leonard Frank Spath (1882–1957) Great Britain
Lorenz Spengler (1720–1807) Denmark
Yaroslav Igorevich Starobogatov (1932–2004) Russia
Robert Edwards Carter Stearns (1827–1909) United States
Edward Step (1855–1933) Great Britain
Victor Sterki (1846–1933) Switzerland
William Stimpson (1832–1872) United States
Charles Stokes (1780s–1853) Great Britain
Adolf Stossich (1824–1900 ) Italy
Hermann Strebel (1834–1915) Germany, Mexico.
Ellen E. Strong United States
Samuel Emanuel Studer (1757–1834) Switzerland
Rudolf Sturany (1867–1935) Austria, works
Henry Suter (1841–1918) Switzerland, New Zealand
William John Swainson (1789–1855) Great Britain
Ernest Ruthven Sykes (1867–1954) Great Britain

T
Iwao Taki (1901–1984) Japan
Cesare Maria Tapparone-Canefri (1838–1891) Italy
Dwight Willard Taylor (1932–2006) United States, also paleontologist, Hydrobiidae and Physidae<ref>Alan R. Kabat, Richard I. Johnson (January 2008) "Dwight Willard Taylor (1932–2006): 'His Life And Malacological Research". Malacologia 50(1): 175–218 </ref>
Ange Paulin Terver (1798–1875) France
Johannes Thiele (1860–1935) Germany
William Theobald (1829–1908) Great Britain.
Thomas Everett Thompson (1933–1990) England
Donn Lloyd Tippett (1924-2014) American psychiatrist and malacologist, noted for his works on the family Turridae s.l.
John Read le Brockton Tomlin (1864–1954) Great Britain.
Franz Hermann Troschel (1810–1882) Germany
George Washington Tryon (1838–1888) United States
Hippolyt Tschapeck (1825–1897) Austria
Stella Turk (1925–2017) Great Britain
Ruth Turner (full name Ruth Dixon Turner) (1915–2000) United States
William Turton (1762–1835) Great Britain, naturalist

V
Albert Jean Baptiste Marie Vayssière (1854–1942) France, malacologist and entomologist 
Michael Vecchione United States 
Bernard Verdcourt (1925–2011) Great Britain
Joseph Verco (1851–1933) Australia
Geerat J. Vermeij (1946–) Netherlands
Addison Emery Verrill (1839–1926) United States, zoologist, authority on the living cephalopods, especially the colossal squids of the North Atlantic
Emily Hoskins Vokes American malacologist and paleontologist (1930– )
Harold Vokes American malacologist (1908–1998)
Gilbert L. Voss (1918–1989) United States 

W
Erich Wagler (1884–1951) Germany
Johann Andreas Wagner (1797–1861) Germany
Rudolf Wagner (1805–1864) Germany
Rudolf Graf Walderdorff (–1866) Austria
Bryant Walker (1856–1936) United States
Andrew Rodger Waterston (1912–1996) Great Britain
Peter Ward (1949-) United States
Robert Boog Watson (1823–1910) Scotland
William Henry Webster (1850–1931) Cheshire, Great Britain; Waiuku, New Zealand 
Heinrich Conrad Weinkauff (1817–1886) Germany
Wilhelm August Wenz (1886–1945) Germany
Carl Agardh Westerlund (1831–1908) Sweden
Albert G. Wetherby (1833-1902) United States
Wolfgang Karl Weyrauch (1907–1970) South America, freshwater gastropods and land gastropods
Gilbert Percy Whitley (1903–1975) Great Britain, lived in Australia
Andrzej Wiktor (1931–2018) Poland
Mary Alice Willcox (1856–1953) United States
Thomas Vernon Wollaston (1822–1878) Great Britain
William Wood (1774–1857) United Kingdom
Martha Burton Woodhead Williamson (1843–1922) United States
Bernard Barham Woodward (1853–1930) Great Britain

See also
List of biologists
List of zoologists by author abbreviation

References

Further reading
Coan E. V., Kabat A. R. & Petit R. E. (15 February 2009). 2,400 years of malacology, 6th ed., 830 pp. & 32 pp. [Annex of Collations]. American Malacological Society
Coan E. V., Kabat A. R. & Petit R. E. (15 February 2011). 2,400 years of malacology, 8th ed., 936 pp. + 42 pp. [Annex of Collations]. American Malacological Society
Coan E. V., Kabat A. R. & Petit R. E. (8 March 2012). 2,400 years of malacology, 9th ed., 1024 pp. + 76 pp. [Annex of Collations]. American Malacological Society
Coan E. V. & Kabat A. R. (8 January 2016).  2,400 years of malacology, 13th ed., 1254 pp. American Malacological Society
Biographies and bibliographies of eminent conchologists at Conchological Society of Great Britain & Ireland website
Alphabetical Listing of Conchologists – Malacologists
Abbott, R. T. & Young M. E. (eds.) (1973). American Malacologists: A national register of professional and amateur malacologists and private shell collectors and biographies of early American mollusk workers born between 1618 and 1900.'' American Malacologists, Falls Church, Virginia. Consolidated/Drake Press, Philadelphia. 494 pp.

.
Malacologists